Aura im Sinngrund (officially: Aura i. Sinngrund) is a community in the Main-Spessart district in the Regierungsbezirk of Lower Franconia (Unterfranken) in Bavaria, Germany and a member of the Verwaltungsgemeinschaft (municipal association) of Burgsinn.

Geography

Location 
The community lies some 20 km northwest of Gemünden am Main in the valley of the Aura river in the Spessart Nature Park (Naturpark Spessart). The community's northern limit forms Bavaria's boundary with Hesse.

History 
In 1059, Aura had its first documentary mention in a document conferring rights in the royal hunting forest on the Fulda Abbey. In 1803 most of the former Prince-Bishopric of Würzburg Amt was made part of Prince Primate von Dalberg's newly formed Principality of Aschaffenburg. In 1808 it became a condominium of the Kingdom of Bavaria and the Electorate of Hesse-Kassel, falling entirely to Bavaria in 1814. In the course of administrative reform in Bavaria, the current community came into being with the Gemeindeedikt (“Municipal Edict”) of 1818.

Demographics

The current population is around 1,000.

Economy
Municipal taxes in 1999 amounted to €407,000 (converted), of which net business taxes amounted to €13,000.

Governance

Since March 2008 Wolfgang Blum (SPD/UAB) has been the mayor. He replaced Walter Sachs (CDU).

Coat of arms 
The community's arms might be described thus: Quartered, first dancetty of three gules and argent, second barry of eight Or and of the first, third bendy of five of the first and third, fourth of the second a fess of the third paly wavy of three of the first.

Four historic coats of arms are marshalled on this escutcheon, each one representing a former overlord. The arms once borne by the Prince-Bishops of Würzburg appear on the dexter (armsbearer's right, viewer's left) side in chief (that is, in the upper row). Next to this are the arms of the Counts of Rieneck. On the dexter side in base (lower row) are those once borne by the Barons of Hutten, and beside this those borne by the Barons of Thüngen.

Arts and culture

Buildings 
The community's appearance is dominated by the Catholic Kuratienkirche zu den Sieben Schmerzen Mariens (Church of Our Lady of the Seven Sorrows).

The former castle (Schloss, originally a hunting lodge for the Prince-Bishops of Würzburg) nowadays houses Aura's primary school.

The former parish church St. Erasmus (13th century, Gothic) now serves as cemetery chapel.

See also: list of protected monuments in Aura (German)

Further reading 
Historisches Gemeindeverzeichnis für Hessen. Heft 2: Gebietsänderungen der hessischen Gemeinden und Kreise 1834 bis 1967, publisher: Hessian State Statistical Office, Wiesbaden, o.J., p. 56, 95.
Karl Richter: Gemünden = Historischer Atlas von Bayern, Teil Franken 1,11, Munich 1963, UB: 50/2001, 1,11, p. 204f.
Winkopps Zeitschrift: Der Rheinische Bund, Heft 2/4, p. 389-394.

References

External links 

 Community’s official webpage 
 Aura im Sinngrund as part of the Verwaltungsgemeinschaft of Burgsinn 

Main-Spessart
Articles which contain graphical timelines